McMurdo Station is a United States Antarctic research station on the south tip of Ross Island, which is in the New Zealand-claimed Ross Dependency on the shore of McMurdo Sound in Antarctica. It is operated by the United States through the United States Antarctic Program (USAP), a branch of the National Science Foundation. The station is the largest community in Antarctica, capable of supporting up to 1,200 residents, and serves as one of three year-round United States Antarctic science facilities. All personnel and cargo going to or coming from Amundsen–Scott South Pole Station first pass through McMurdo. By road, McMurdo is 3 kilometres (1.9 mi) from New Zealand's smaller Scott Base.

History
The station takes its name from its geographic location on McMurdo Sound, named after Lieutenant Archibald McMurdo of British ship . The Terror, commanded by Northern Irish explorer Francis Crozier, along with expedition flagship Erebus under command of English Explorer James Clark Ross, first charted the area in 1841. The British explorer Robert Falcon Scott established a base camp close to this spot in 1902 and built a cabin there that was named Discovery Hut. It still stands as a historic monument near the water's edge on Hut Point at McMurdo Station. The volcanic rock of the site is the southernmost bare ground accessible by ship in the world. The United States officially opened its first station at McMurdo on February 16, 1956, as part of Operation Deep Freeze.  The base,  built by the U.S. Navy Seabees, was initially designated  Naval Air Facility McMurdo. On November 28, 1957, Admiral George J. Dufek visited McMurdo with a U.S. congressional delegation for a change-of-command ceremony.

McMurdo Station was the center of United States logistical operations during the International Geophysical Year, an international scientific effort that lasted from July 1, 1957, to December 31, 1958. After the IGY, it became the center for US scientific as well as logistical activities in Antarctica. The Antarctic Treaty, subsequently signed by over forty-five governments, regulates intergovernmental relations with respect to Antarctica and governs the conduct of daily life at McMurdo for United States Antarctic Program (USAP) participants. The Antarctic Treaty and related agreements, collectively called the Antarctic Treaty System (ATS), opened for signature on December 1, 1959, and officially entered into force on June 23, 1961.

The first scientific diving protocols were established before 1960 and the first diving operations were documented in November 1961.

Nuclear power (1962–1972)

On March 3, 1962, the U.S. Navy activated the PM-3A nuclear power plant at the station. The unit was prefabricated in modules to facilitate transport and assembly. A single core no larger than an oil drum served as the heart of the nuclear reactor. These size and weight restrictions aimed to allow delivery of the reactor in an LC-130 Hercules aircraft. However, the components were actually delivered by ship. Engineers applied the reactor's power, for instance, in producing steam for the salt-water distillation plant. As a result of continuing safety issues (hairline cracks in the reactor and water leaks), the U.S. Army Nuclear Power Program decommissioned the plant in 1972. Conventional diesel generators replaced the nuclear power station, with a number of  diesel generators in a central powerhouse providing electric power. A conventionally fueled water-desalination plant provided fresh water.

Contemporary functions

, McMurdo Station was Antarctica's largest community and a functional, modern-day science station, including a harbor, three airfields (two seasonal), a heliport and more than 100 buildings, including the Albert P. Crary Science and Engineering Center. The station is also home to the continent's two ATMs, both provided by Wells Fargo Bank. The work done at McMurdo Station primarily focuses on science, but most of the residents (approximately 1,000 in the summer and around 250 in the winter) are not scientists, but station personnel who provide support for operations, logistics, information technology, construction, and maintenance.

Scientists and other personnel at McMurdo are participants in the USAP, which coordinates research and operational support in the region. Werner Herzog's 2007 documentary Encounters at the End of the World reports on the life and culture of McMurdo Station from the point-of-view of residents. Anthony Powell's 2013 documentary Antarctica: A Year on Ice provides time-lapse photography of Antarctica intertwined with personal accounts from residents of McMurdo Station and of the adjacent Scott Base over the course of a year.

An annual sealift by cargo ships as part of Operation Deep Freeze delivers 8 million U.S. gallons (6.6 million imperial gallons/42 million liters) of fuel and 11 million pounds (5 million kg) of supplies and equipment for McMurdo residents. The ships, operated by the U.S. Military Sealift Command, are crewed by civilian mariners. Cargo may range from mail, construction materials, trucks, tractors, dry and frozen food, to scientific instruments. U.S. Coast Guard icebreakers break a ship channel through ice-clogged McMurdo Sound in order for supply ships to reach Winter Quarters Bay at McMurdo. Additional supplies and personnel are flown into nearby Williams Field from Christchurch in New Zealand.

Between 1962 and 1963, 28 Arcas sounding rockets were launched from McMurdo Station.

McMurdo Station stands about two miles (3 km) from Scott Base, the New Zealand science station, and all of Ross Island lies within a sector claimed by New Zealand. Criticism has been leveled at the base regarding its construction projects, particularly the McMurdo-(Amundsen-Scott) South Pole highway.

McMurdo Station has attempted to improve environmental management and waste removal in order to adhere to the Protocol on Environmental Protection to the Antarctic Treaty, signed on October 4, 1991, which entered into force on January 14, 1998. This agreement prevents development and provides for the protection of the Antarctic environment through five specific annexes on marine pollution, fauna and flora, environmental impact assessments, waste management, and protected areas. It prohibits all activities relating to mineral resources except scientific ones. A new waste-treatment facility was built at McMurdo in 2003. Three Enercon E-33 (330 kW each) wind turbines were deployed in 2009 to power McMurdo and New Zealand's Scott Base, reducing diesel consumption by 11% or 463,000 litres per year. McMurdo Station (nicknamed "Mac-Town" by its residents) continues to operate as the hub for American activities on the Antarctic continent.

McMurdo Station briefly gained global notice when an anti-war protest took place on February 15, 2003. During the rally, about 50 scientists and station personnel gathered to protest the coming invasion of Iraq by the United States. McMurdo Station was the only Antarctic location to hold such a rally.

Scientific diving operations continue with 10,859 dives having been conducted under the ice from 1989 to 2006. A hyperbaric chamber is available for support of polar diving operations.

Climate

With all months having an average temperature below freezing, McMurdo features a polar ice cap climate (Köppen EF). However, in the warmest months (December and January) the monthly average high temperature may occasionally rise above freezing. The place is protected from cold waves from the interior of Antarctica by the Transantarctic Mountains, so temperatures below −40° are rare, compared to more exposed places like Neumayer Station, which usually gets those temperatures a few times every year, often as early as May, and sometimes even as early as April, and very rarely above 0 °C.  The highest temperature ever recorded at McMurdo was 10.8 °C on December 21, 1987. There is enough snowmelt in summer that a limited amount of vegetation can grow, specifically a few species of moss and lichen.

Communications
For a time, McMurdo had Antarctica's only television station, AFAN-TV, running vintage programs provided by the military. The station's equipment was susceptible to "electronic burping" from the diesel generators that provide electricity in the outpost. The station was profiled in a 1974 article in TV Guide magazine. Now, McMurdo receives three channels of the US Military's American Forces Network, the Australia Network, and New Zealand news broadcasts.  Television broadcasts are received by satellite at Black Island, and transmitted  by digital microwave to McMurdo.  Also, for a time, McMurdo also played host to one of the only two shortwave broadcast stations in Antarctica.  The station—AFAN McMurdo—transmitted with a power of 1 kilowatt on the shortwave frequency of 6,012 kHz and became a target for shortwave radio listening to hobbyists around the world because of its rarity.  The station continued broadcasting on shortwave into the 1980s when it dropped shortwave while continuing FM transmission.

McMurdo Station receives both Internet and voice communications by satellite communications via the Optus D1 satellite and relayed to Sydney, Australia.  A satellite dish at Black Island provides 20 Mbit/s Internet connectivity and voice communications.  Voice communications are tied into the United States Antarctic Program headquarters in Centennial, Colorado, providing inbound and outbound calls to McMurdo from the US. Voice communications within the station are conducted via VHF radio.

Testing of the Starlink service began in January 2023, with a second terminal providing connectivity for the Allan Hills field camp brought in November 2022.The Starlink test ran from January to March of 2023, when it was shut off indefinitely to analyze test data. Current McMurdo residents no longer can connect to Starlink.

Transportation

Surface
McMurdo has the world's most southerly harbor. A multitude of on- and off-road vehicles transport people and cargo around the station area, including Ivan the Terra Bus (a pun on Ivan the Terrible). There is a road from McMurdo to the New Zealand Scott Base and South Pole, the South Pole Traverse.

Air
McMurdo is serviced seasonally by three airports:
 Phoenix Airfield (ICAO: NZFX), a compacted snow runway which replaced Pegasus Field (ICAO: NZPG) in 2017
 Sea Ice Runway (ICAO: NZIR), an annual runway constructed on the sea ice nearest McMurdo Station
 Williams Field (ICAO: NZWD), a permanent snow runway

Historic sites

The Richard E. Byrd Historic Monument was erected at McMurdo in 1965. It comprises a bronze bust on black marble,  square, on a wooden platform, bearing inscriptions describing the polar exploration achievements of Richard E. Byrd. It has been designated a Historic Site or Monument (HSM 54), following a proposal by the United States to the Antarctic Treaty Consultative Meeting.

The inscription details the achievements of Antarctica's first nuclear power plant. It has been designated a Historic Site or Monument (HSM 85), following a proposal by the United States to the Antarctic Treaty Consultative Meeting.

Points of interest
Facilities at the station include:

 Albert P. Crary Science and Engineering Center (CSEC)
 Chapel of the Snows Interdenominational Chapel
 Observation Hill
 Discovery Hut, built during Scott's 1901–1903 expedition
 Williams Field airport
 Memorial plaque to three airmen killed in 1946 while surveying the territory
 Ross Island Disc Golf Course

See also

 Air New Zealand Flight 901
 Amundsen–Scott South Pole Station
 ANDRILL
 List of Antarctic field camps
 The Antarctic Sun
 Byrd Station
 Castle Rock
 Chapel of the Snows
 Crime in Antarctica
 Ellsworth Station
 Erebus crystal
 First women to fly to Antarctica
 Hallett Station
 List of Antarctic expeditions
 Little America (exploration base)
 Marble Point
 McMurdo Sound
 Mount Erebus
 Palmer Station
 Plateau Station
 List of Antarctic research stations
 Ross Ice Shelf
 Scott Base
 Siple Station
 Williams Field

Notes

References
 Clarke, Peter: On the Ice. Rand McNally & Company, 1966
 "Facts About the United States Antarctic Research Program". Division of Polar Programs, National Science Foundation; July 1982.

 United States Antarctic Research Program Calendar 1983

External links

 United States Antarctic Program page with McMurdo Station webcam
 High resolution GigaPan picture of McMurdo station
 PM-3a Nuclear Reactor at McMurdo station

 
1956 establishments in Antarctica
Buildings and structures in Antarctica
Defunct nuclear reactors
Historic Sites and Monuments of Antarctica
Outposts of the Ross Dependency
Ports and harbours of the Ross Dependency